Maianthemum flexuosum is a perennial, terrestrial understory herb of cloud forests from southern Mexico to Nicaragua. It has been found at sites from 1300 to 2800 m elevation.

Description
Leafy, arching stems are hairless and slightly ribbed.

Leaves
Leaf blades sometimes have small hairs but are usually hairless, lance- to egg-shaped with pointed tips and rounded to slightly tapered bases and with undulating edges.

Flowering clusters
25 to 65 flowers are set in a complex raceme with a main axis 5 – 18 cm long that is drooping and flexuous. The axis is smooth to slightly ribbed, green, and smooth. There are 10 to 16 nodes along the main axis, 1-8 (up to 20) mm apart and arranged in 2 rows along the main axis. Each node has 2 to 4 (sometimes up to 6) flowers set on drooping pedicels that are usually 8-21 mm long.

Flowers and fruits
The flowers have tepals that are spreading to bent back, 5-11 mm long and usually lavender to pink (rarely white to green-white). Stamens are inserted slightly (about 1 mm) above the tepal bases. Fruits are distinctly 3-lobed, 7-11 mm across, green when immature, ripening to red. Flowering is from January to June; fruits set May to August. Plants sometimes have both flowers and fruits.

Distribution
Maianthemum flexuosum has been found in El Salvador, Guatemala, Honduras and Nicaragua and several states in Mexico Southeast including Chiapas, Guerrero, Hidalgo, Michoacán, Oaxaca, and Veracruz.

Habitat and ecology
This is an understory herb of wet, broad-leaved cloud forests. It is often solitary or sometimes loosely colonial and typically found at sites from 1450 to 2200 m elevation although it has been found at sites as low as 1000 m to others at over 2500 m.

References

flexuosum
Flora of Chiapas
Flora of Oaxaca
Flora of Veracruz
Flora of El Salvador
Flora of Guatemala
Flora of Honduras
Flora of Nicaragua